Desirée Mariottini was a 16-year-old Italian murder victim killed by African migrants, last seen on 18 October 2018 in Rome, Italy.

Background
Mariottini was reportedly born and lived in Cisterna di Latina in the region of Lazio.

The San Lorenzo district is a historic neighborhood still scarred from World War II bombings, and is known for its left-wing political leanings.

Murder and investigation
On 17 October 2018, Mariottini reportedly missed the last bus and did not return to her home, and was found dead one day later.

Mariottini was drugged and sexually assaulted in a "drug den" in the San Lorenzo district in Rome. While unconscious, Mariottini was assaulted multiple times by an unknown number of assailants. An autopsy showed she had taken drugs as early as the afternoon of October 18, and died later on the night of 19 October. It also showed that Mariottini was likely raped as she was dying.

On 25 October, two people were arrested for the murder: Mamadou Gara, 26 and Brian Minteh, 43. Both are accused, along other suspects, of gang rape, drug possession and voluntary homicide. The police are looking for at least two other men involved in the murder. The criminals were identified after a series of testimonies and findings made in the building where the body was found.

Around October 26, two more arrests were made in the case; Alinno Chima, age 40, and Yusif Salia, whose age was not specified.

Trial 
The trial of the four accused began in October 2019.

Aftermath
Mariottini was buried on Sunday 30 October in Cisterna di Latina in a ceremony attended by hundreds and Mayor of Rome Virginia Raggi declared a day of mourning.

Visit by Minister Matteo Salvini at the scene of the crime
On October 24, 2018 interior minister Matteo Salvini, the leader of the anti-migration Northern League party, went to the abandoned building where the girl's body was found.

Residents of the San Lorenzo district prevented Salvini from placing a rose outside the building where the victim was found, feeling Salvini was exploiting the young woman's death. He returned later in the day unannounced and placed the flowers in front of the gate.

Pronouncements by the President of the European Parliament Antonio Tajani
The tragedy of Desirée "must be the last that happens in Italy and in Rome, an abandoned city, the degradation is evident, moral and social, more checks are needed in the city, more men and women of the police are needed, especially at night".

The decision of the mayor of Rome
The Rome Mayor Virginia Raggi decided to proclaim a day of mourning for the city in conjunction with the funeral of Desirée Mariottini. She also declared the intention of city authorities to have the building demolished. In a social media post, she stated that as a mayor, as a woman and the mayor of the city she could not tolerate the thought of this crime and called it an "atrocious crime".

On the evening of 25 October 2018, a spontaneous torch-light procession by the people of Rome San Lorenzo was organized to ask for "justice for Desirée".

Protests against the mayor of Rome
On 27 October 2018, the citizens of Rome protested against deterioration of the city, citing unsafe, damaged buildings and excessive drug use as some of their concerns.

See also 
 List of solved missing person cases
 Murder of Meredith Kercher
 Murder of Ashley Ann Olsen
 Murder of Pamela Mastropietro

References

2010s in Rome
2010s missing person cases
2018 murders in Italy
Female murder victims
Formerly missing people
Incidents of violence against girls
Incidents of violence against women
Missing person cases in Italy
Mariottini, Desirée
Murder in Rome
October 2018 crimes in Europe
October 2018 events in Italy
Rape in Italy
Mariottini, Desirée
Urban decay in Europe
Violence against women in Italy
Cisterna di Latina